Renato Turi (May 12, 1920 – April 5, 1991) was an Italian actor and voice actor.

Biography
Turi was born in Florence to Umberto Turi and Giulia Ragni.  He was considered to be an important figure in Italian dubbing. At an early age, Turi visited theatres across Italy with his parents before moving to Rome. He felt a great desire to perform on stage during those visits. During the outbreak of World War II, Turi served at the airport in Elmas, Sardinia which was bombarded by American forces, seriously injuring Turi resulting in his leg amputation. As a result, he had to give up his dreams as a theatre actor.

Nevertheless, Turi pursued an acting career in film, television and radio, acting in over six films and starring in many television productions. Despite his inability to make a stage appearance, he served as the voice of God in the 1973 musical comedy Aggiungi un posto a tavola. His voice was then re-recorded for later performances even after his death.

Turi was more successful as a voice dubber. He was the founder of the dubbing society SEDIF and he frequently collaborated with other dubbers including Giuseppe Rinaldi, Wanda Tettoni, Oreste Lionello, Gianfranco Bellini and Emilio Cigoli. Turi often provided the Italian voices of Walter Matthau, Lee Marvin, Christopher Lee, Telly Savalas, Lee Van Cleef, John Carradine, Lionel Jeffries, Charlton Heston, Sidney Poitier, Livio Lorenzon and Arthur Kennedy in most of their movies. In his animated roles, Turi voiced Jasper in the Italian version of One Hundred and One Dalmatians as well as Edgar in the Italian version of The Aristocats.

Death
Turi died in Rome on April 5, 1991 one month before his 71st birthday. He was laid to rest in the Campo Verano. Turi's family members were given important positions within the dubbing company which he founded.

Filmography

Cinema
Garibaldi (1961) - Narrator, Voice
Hercules in the Haunted World (1961) - Voice, Uncredited
The Night of the Devils (1972) - Il Detective In Pensione - Uncredited
Number One (1973)
L'assassinio dei fratelli Rosselli (1974)
Illustrious Corpses (1976) - Television anchorman 
Evelina e i suoi figli (1990) - Final film role

Dubbing roles

Animation
Jasper in One Hundred and One Dalmatians
Edgar in The Aristocats
Policeman in Lady and the Tramp
Thomas Jefferson in Ben and Me
Lemuel Gulliver in Gulliver's Travels
King Amo in Alakazam the Great
Julius Caesar in Asterix and Cleopatra

Live action
Felix Anders in Strangers When We Meet
Tony Gagouts in Who's Got the Action?
Carson Dyle in Charade
Professor Groeteschele in Fail Safe
Ted Caselle in Mirage
Whiplash Willie Gingrich in The Fortune Cookie
Oscar Madison in The Odd Couple
Horace Vandergelder in Hello, Dolly!
Charley Varrick in Charley Varrick
Jack Martin in The Laughing Policeman
Zachary Garber in The Taking of Pelham One Two Three
Willy Clark in The Sunshine Boys
Marvin Michaels in California Suite
Sorrowful Jones in Little Miss Marker
Miles Kendig in Hopscotch
Trabucco in Buddy Buddy
Thomas Bartholomew Red in Pirates
Father Maurice in The Little Devil
Brundage in Not as a Stranger
Lloyd Carracart in Pillars of the Sky
John R. Miller in The Rack
Orville "Flash" Perkins in Raintree County
Charlie Strom in The Killers
John Reisman in The Dirty Dozen
Walker in Point Blank
Paul Ryker in Sergeant Ryker
American Pilot in Hell in the Pacific
Ben Rumson in Paint Your Wagon
Harry Wargrave in Avalanche Express
Nick Alexander in The Delta Force
Count Dracula in Dracula
Count Dracula in One More Time
Franklyn Marsh in Dr. Terror's House of Horrors
Mr. U.N. Owen in Ten Little Indians
Ship's vampire in The Magic Christian
Count De Rochefort in The Four Musketeers: Milady's Revenge
Cardinale Spinosi in The Miser
Dirk Hanley in The Lawless Breed
Crew Boss in Arrow in the Dust
Al Drucker in Ten Wanted Men
Ed Bailey in Gunfight at the O.K. Corral
Ed McGaffey in The Tin Star
First Sergeant Rickett in The Young Lions
Jonathan Corbett in The Big Gundown
Sabata in Sabata
Sabata in Return of Sabata
Jaroo in El Condor
Travis in Barquero
Captain Apache in Captain Apache
Dakota in The Stranger and the Gunfighter
Father John / Lewis in God's Gun
China in Code Name: Wild Geese
Igor in Goliath and the Barbarians
Jimmy Jesse in The Sheriff
Count Fosco Di Vallebruna in Knight of 100 Faces
Kovo in Fury of the Pagans
Sergeant Rodriguez in The Secret of the Black Falcon
King Zagro in The Vengeance of Ursus
Court Prefect in Messalina vs. the Son of Hercules
Salmanassar in Hercules and the Tyrants of Babylon
Lash in Buckaroo: The Winchester Does Not Forgive
Artemio Di Giovanni in Torture Me But Kill Me with Kisses
Ziby Fletcher in The Kentuckian
Aaron in The Ten Commandments
Stamp Proctor in Around the World in 80 Days
Amos Force in The Last Hurrah
Cassius Starbuckle in The Man Who Shot Liberty Valance
Dr. Bernardo in Everything You Always Wanted to Know About Sex* (*But Were Afraid to Ask)
George Taylor in Planet of the Apes
Will Penny in Will Penny
Stewart Graff in Earthquake
Matthew Garth in Midway
Charlie Sievers in Cape Fear
Joe Coburn in The Slender Thread
Jim Howie in The Scalphunters
Ernst Stavro Blofeld in On Her Majesty's Secret Service
Grandpa Potts in Chitty Chitty Bang Bang
Solicitor in Lola
Andrew Robertson in Red Ball Express
Gregory Miller in Blackboard Jungle
Tommy Tyler in Edge of the City
Kimani Wa Karanja in Something of Value
Gordon Ralfe in A Patch of Blue
Hondo in Apache
John Strock in Master of the World
Paul Kersey in Death Wish II
Tom Moore in Roots
Orson in Mork & Mindy (seasons 1-2)
Alan-a-Dale in The Story of Robin Hood and His Merrie Men
Young Bull in Winchester '73
Judge in Five Dolls for an August Moon
Nick Molise in Totò lascia o raddoppia?

References

External links

1920 births
1991 deaths
Actors from Florence
Italian male voice actors
Italian male stage actors
Italian male television actors
Italian male film actors
Italian male radio actors
Italian voice directors
20th-century Italian male actors
Italian military personnel of World War II
Burials at Campo Verano
Italian amputees